City of Houston Fire Department (HFD) is the agency that provides fire protection and emergency medical services for the city of Houston, Texas, United States, the fourth largest city in the United States. HFD is responsible for preserving life and property for a population of more than 2 million in an area totaling . The department is the largest fire department (by number of personnel) in the state of Texas.

The administrative offices of HFD are located on the 7th floor of 1801 Smith Street (a part of the Cullen Center) in Downtown Houston. They were previously located at the City of Houston Fire Department Logistical Center & Maintenance Depot.

The Houston Fire Department got its start in 1838 with one station known as Protection Company No. 1. By 1859, the volunteer department had grown to three stations. After 57 years of service, Houston converted the department over to all paid members.

Notable Incidents

Southwest Inn Fire 

On May 31, 2013, the Southwest Inn fire broke out in an Indian restaurant in Southwest Houston before spreading to an adjoining hotel. The fire claimed the biggest casualty loss for the Houston Fire Department since its inception. Four firefighters were killed and 13 others were injured while fighting the five-alarm fire at the Southwest Inn. "Iron" Bill Dowling, who lost his legs and damaged his brain in the fire, died in Colorado on March 7, 2017, after a short hospitalization for pneumonia and cellulitis, attributed to his injuries.

2016 Houston Fire 
After the spreading of a backyard fire in Spring Branch, Houston, Texas, a packaging warehouse burned down during a four-alarm fire which included exploding canisters of hazardous material. Nearly 200 firefighters were dispatched to the site over several hours. As of May 2016, the initial cause of the fire remains unknown.

Stations and Apparatus
Below is a listing of all Houston Fire Department fire stations and their assigned apparatus.

In 2018 there was a post-Hurricane Harvey plan to replace fire station 104 for $11 million.

Gallery

References

External links

 Houston Fire Department
 Houston Professional Fire Fighters Association
 Houston Fire Fighters Calendar
 Houston Fire Museum
 Houston Fire Fire Fighter Memorial Web Site
 Houston Fire Station Google Map
 Houston Firefighters' Bagpipe & Drummer Corps
  Houston Fire Station 68

Fire
Fire departments in Texas